Agnes Romilly White (1872–1945) was an Irish novelist who wrote about the poverty, bereavement and comedy that she saw around her.

Life and work
White was the born to Rev. Robert White and his wife Anna Maria in Tyrone. Her father was the rector of St. Elizabeth's Church of Ireland and was based in Dundonald, from 1890 to 1912. White made the small village and the cottages famous in her books. White had at least 2 sisters and 2 brothers. One of her brothers was Herbert Martin Oliver White, a lecturer at Queen's University was appointed to the Chair of English at Trinity College Dublin over the poet Austin Clarke.

She was thought to be an excellent observer of people and criticism of her appeared in Punch and The Observer: ‘The lilt of the dialogue goes to one's head like wine: the spell is laid upon one as soon as any character chose to open his mount.'

Bibliography

References

Further reading

1872 births
1945 deaths
20th-century Irish novelists
Irish women novelists
People from County Tyrone
20th-century Irish women writers